Timothy Kwok Chi-Pei (born 28 March 1959) is a Hong Kong-born Anglican bishop who is serving as Bishop of Eastern Kowloon (diocesan bishop of the Diocese of Eastern Kowloon, Hong Kong) since November 2014.

Early life
Kwok Chi-Pei was born in Hong Kong at the year of 1959, he was baptized in 1968 and the Sacrament of Confirmation in 1974.

Ministry
On 21 September 1988, he was ordained deacon from the Diocese of Hong Kong and Macao and ordained priest in the next year; from 1988 to 1994, he served as associate priest in St Peter's Church, Castle Peak and priest-in-charge in 1995 until his episcopal ordination in 2014.

Kwok was elected as the second diocesan bishop of the Diocese of Eastern Kowloon on 30 March 2014; he was consecrated a bishop on 23 November 2014, by Paul Kwong, Archbishop of Hong Kong, at St John's Cathedral (Hong Kong). On the next day, 24 November 2014, Kwok was officially enthroned in Holy Trinity Cathedral.

Family
Kwok is married with two children.

References

1959 births
Living people
Anglican bishops of Eastern Kowloon